Cyclamen europaeum is a scientific name that has been applied to three species:

Cyclamen purpurascens
Cyclamen hederifolium
Cyclamen repandum